Horton is a city in Brown County, Kansas, United States.  As of the 2020 census, the population of the city was 1,523.

History
Horton was founded in 1886. It was named for Albert H. Horton, chief justice of the Kansas Supreme Court.

On January 22, 2013, the host of CNBC television show The Profit toured Horton in hopes of revitalizing Horton's downtown business district.  Within 18 months, the community started the “Reinvent Horton” campaign to clean up the community and update "run-down" aspects of it, including the installation of curbs, sidewalks, and light poles, razed some buildings, and a large community effort to try to change Horton.

Geography
Horton is located at  (39.663817, -95.528130).

Climate
Humid continental climate is a climatic region typified by large seasonal temperature differences, with warm to hot (and often humid) summers and cold (sometimes severely cold) winters. The Köppen Climate Classification subtype for this climate is "Dfa". (Hot Summer Continental Climate).

Demographics

2010 census
As of the census of 2010, there were 1,776 people, 732 households, and 453 families residing in the city. The racial makeup of the city was 82.5% White, 0.8% African American, 10.7% Native American, 0.5% Asian, 0.8% from other races, and 4.6% from two or more races. Hispanic or Latino of any race were 3.7% of the population.

There were 732 households, of which 31.8% had children under the age of 18 living with them, 40.8% were married couples living together, 14.5% had a female householder with no husband present, 6.6% had a male householder with no wife present, and 38.1% were non-families. 34.3% of all households were made up of individuals, and 16.7% had someone living alone who was 65 years of age or older. The average household size was 2.38 and the average family size was 3.02.

The median age in the city was 38.3 years. 27.5% of residents were under the age of 18; 8.3% were between the ages of 18 and 24; 21.2% were from 25 to 44; 22.8% were from 45 to 64; and 20.2% were 65 years of age or older. The gender makeup of the city was 48.5% male and 51.5% female.

2000 census
As of the census of 2000, there were 1,967 people, 812 households, and 506 families residing in the city. The racial makeup of the city was 84.65% White, 0.97% African American, 10.78% Native American, 0.66% Asian, 0.51% from other races, and 2.44% from two or more races. Hispanic or Latino of any race were 2.08% of the population.

There were 812 households, out of which 29.3% had children under the age of 18 living with them, 47.3% were married couples living together, 11.6% had a female householder with no husband present, and 37.6% were non-families. 34.5% of all households were made up of individuals, and 18.8% had someone living alone who was 65 years of age or older. The average household size was 2.35 and the average family size was 3.00.

In the city, the population was spread out, with 27.5% under the age of 18, 6.7% from 18 to 24, 22.9% from 25 to 44, 20.2% from 45 to 64, and 22.7% who were 65 years of age or older. The median age was 39 years. For every 100 females, there were 88.4 males. For every 100 females age 18 and over, there were 84.1 males.

The median income for a household in the city was $22,991, and the median income for a family was $31,447. Males had a median income of $25,000 versus $21,474 for females. The per capita income for the city was $13,063. About 14.0% of families and 17.4% of the population were below the poverty line, including 17.9% of those under age 18 and 18.5% of those age 65 or over.

Education
 Horton High School

Notable people
 Boots Adams, businessman
 Robert Harder, Kansas legislator

References

External links

 City of Horton
 Horton - Directory of Public Officials
 USD 430, local school district
 Horton city map, KDOT

Cities in Kansas
Cities in Brown County, Kansas
Populated places established in 1886
1886 establishments in Kansas